"Larger than Life" is a song by American boy band Backstreet Boys from their third studio album, Millennium. It was released on September 7, 1999, as the second single from the album. It was written by band member Brian Littrell with Max Martin and Kristian Lundin, who also produced the song along with Rami Yacoub. The song is a "thank you" for their fans' encouragement and devotion. Music critics praised its memorable melody, singalong lyrics and the band's vocal performance. It was also on Blender's list of the 500 Greatest Songs Since You Were Born.

Commercially, the song became a top-10 hit in over 14 countries. In the United Kingdom, the song became the band's eighth consecutive top-five single, peaking at number five in October 1999. The music video, directed by Joseph Kahn, holds a Guinness World Record for the 14th most expensive music video with estimated production costs of over $2,100,000 USD. It also broke the record for longest running number one on MTV's Total Request Live.

Background
"Larger than Life" was originally written and composed sometime in 1998 by group member Brian Littrell. When the group traveled to Sweden in early November 1998 to record at Cheiron Studios, alterations and additions were later made to the lyrics by the producers Max Martin and Kristian Lundin. "Larger than Life" was initially registered and copyrighted in December 1998 as an unfinished demo, not being released on Millennium preview snippets.

Prior to February 1999, in order to traditionally follow up the template of releasing upbeat numbers as lead singles (i.e. "We've Got It Goin' On", "Everybody"), "Larger than Life" was intended as the first single from the upcoming album. However, the decision changed upon hearing the completed version of "I Want It That Way" in a meeting with Max Martin and Andreas Carlsson in February 1999. Thus, plans were canceled and "Larger than Life" was later released as the second single.

Composition and lyrics
"Larger than Life" was written by band member Brian Littrell, with additional lyrics by Max Martin and Kristian Lundin. Lundin also produced the song, while Martin and Rami Yacoub produced its "Video Mix" version. The song opens with a boisterous talkbox and AJ McLean’s maniacal "yeah", setting an exhilarated tone. Brian Littrell and Nick Carter start singing, "I may run and hide/When you're screamin’ my name alright/But let me tell ya now there are prices to fame alright."  In the chorus, they sing about how having legions of fans has changed their lives, "All you people can't ya see can't ya see/How your love's affecting our reality/Every time we're down/You can make it right/And that makes you larger than life."

Critical reception
Stephen Thomas Erlewine of AllMusic, during his review for Millennium, picked the song as a highlight from the album, while in its review for The Hits: Chapter One, he wrote that "it may be more tied to its era, but "Larger than Life" is infectious pop nonetheless." Jim Farber of Entertainment Weekly wrote that the song casts "fans as the superhuman force in the exchange between listener and star".

Emily Exton of VH1 listed the song at number 16 on The 20 Best Backstreet Boys Songs list, writing: "Such an introspective look at 'the prices of fame' surely deserves a second chapter dedicated to the social media era. Now that we’re older, can Nick please reveal the 'other' way he wishes he could thank us?." Danielle Sweeney of The Celebrity Cafe listed the song at number 5 on the Top 10 Backstreet Boys Songs list, writing that, "This song was BSB’s dedication to all their loyal (and admittedly crazy) fans. Also, it contained the lyric, 'Looking at the crowd and I see your body sway, c'mon / Wishin' I could thank you in a different way, c’mon' which gave fans everywhere the tiniest glimmer of hope."

Commercial performance
"Larger than Life" was successful in most countries charted. In Australia, the song debuted at number 3, becoming their highest debut on the ARIA Charts, until "Incomplete", which debuted at number-one in 2005. In its second week, the song fell to number 7, until it reached number 3, its peak position, again, in its third week. It was certified platinum by the Australian Recording Industry Association, for selling over 70,000 copies. In Finland, "Larger than Life" was Backstreet Boys' highest-charting single, debuting and peaking at number 2. In the United Kingdom, the song became the band's eighth consecutive top-five single, peaking at number 5, on October 30, 1999.

In New Zealand, the song peaked at number 11, while in Austria, the song peaked at number 15. In France, the song reached number 58. In the United States, the song peaked at number 25 on the Billboard Hot 100 chart. However, the song peaked at number 6 on the Top 40 Mainstream chart. It also reached number 5 in Canada.

Music video

Background
The music video for "Larger than Life" was a big-budget production directed by Joseph Kahn, who also directed "Everybody (Backstreet's Back)" video in June 1997. The video was shot on August 12–14, 1999, in Orlando, Florida, on a soundstage at Universal Studios. The video takes place in a futuristic space setting and includes elaborate special effects and animation, as well as a breakdown with a dance number. It was inspired by the movies Blade Runner and the Star Wars saga.

Synopsis
The video opens with a long pass of a spaceship over the top of the camera as a number of the band's past singles cycle through as if on a radio dial. At the same time, a clock turns to the year 3000. A robot, whose face is portrayed by Antonio Fargas, who played the driver in the "Everybody" video, awakens the band members from their sleep in pods on the ship. Each of the band members is subsequently featured in their own separate vignettes (Nick is with the robots, Kevin is the space fighter, Howie is with the dancers, Brian is fighting with a virus, and AJ retrieving boxes of information), while being shown together on a large stage doing a dance routine with backing dancers. A breakdown was added to the remix version of the song before the final choruses for the extended dance sequence that continues to the end of the song. The vignettes are intercut with the dance sequence following the breakdown.

Reception
The video holds a Guinness World Record for the 14th most expensive music video with estimated production costs of over $2,100,000 USD. John Hamilton of Idolator listed the video at number 3 on their 10 Best Music Videos from the ‘TRL’ Era, writing that, "Showing that they hadn’t lost the funk after all those slow-to-mid-tempo jams, the BSBs busted out this uplifting tribute to their fans, which served as the second single off 1999′s Millennium. Predictably, they scored another TRL chart-topper and sparked an international panty-melting situation."

Track listing

United States
2×12-inch vinyl
A1. "Larger than Life" (Keith Litman club mix) – 6:03
A2. "Larger than Life" (Jazzy Jim Bonus Beats) – 3:44
B1. "Larger than Life" (extended video mix) – 4:14
B2. "Larger than Life" (Keith Litman dub) – 9:16
C1. "Larger than Life" (Jazzy Jim Streetshow Mix) – 4:05
C2. "Larger than Life" (Jack D. Elliot club mix) – 5:48
C3. "Larger than Life" (album version) – 3:52
D1. "Larger than Life" (Eclipse's New Life Mix) – 8:47
D2. "Larger than Life" (Madgroove Progressive Mix) – 8:36

United Kingdom
CD1
 "Larger than Life" (The Video Mix) – 3:56
 "Larger than Life" (Eclipse New Life Mix) – 8:42
 "If You Knew What I Knew" – 5:03

CD2
 "Larger than Life" (The Video Mix) – 3:56
 "Larger than Life" (The Video Mix instrumental) – 3:56 
 "If You Knew What I Knew" – 5:03

Charts

Weekly charts

Year-end charts

Certifications

Release history

MAX version

"{{nihongo|Barairo no Hibi"|バラ色の日々}} is a Japanese-language cover of "Larger than Life" by Japanese girl group MAX. The song is their 18th single and fourth from their album Emotional History (2001). It features an additional writing credit from Yuko Ebine who wrote completely new lyrics for the song. Upon release it peaked at number 11 breaking MAX's string of consecutive top 10 singles beginning with "Seventies" in 1996.

First press copies of the single came with a bonus track: "Barairo no Hibi (Bless Beat Mix)".

Track listing

Chart performance

Personnel
 Executive producer: Johnny Taira
 Produced by Max Matsuura
 Co-produced by Junichi "Randy" Tsuchiya
 Chief director: Vanity Maekawa
 Director: Toshio Fujiwara
 Assistant director: Kenichiro Kimura
 Mixed and recorded by Shinichi Usui
 Recorded by Yasushi Shiota
 Mastered by Yuka Koizumi
Promotion: Takashi Kasuga, Yukio Takemura, Akira Kobayashi, Seiji Fukugawa

Art direction and design
 Art direction and design: Katsuhito Tadokoro
 Photography: Sunao Ohmori
 Stylist: Akarumi Someya
 Hair & make-up: Maki Tawa
 Creative coordinator: Hayato Mori

References

Backstreet Boys songs
MAX (band) songs
1999 songs
1999 singles
2000 singles
Canadian Singles Chart number-one singles
Jive Records singles
Avex Trax singles
Number-one singles in Hungary
Music videos directed by Joseph Kahn
Song recordings produced by Max Martin
Song recordings produced by Rami Yacoub
Songs written by Brian Littrell
Songs written by Kristian Lundin
Songs written by Max Martin